The Onsager–Machlup function is a function that summarizes the dynamics of a continuous stochastic process. It is used to define a probability density for a stochastic process, and it is similar to the Lagrangian of a dynamical system. It is named after Lars Onsager and  who were the first to consider such probability densities.

where  is a Wiener process, can in approximation be described by the probability density function of its value  at a finite number of points in time :

where

A similar approximation is possible for processes in higher dimensions. The approximation is more accurate for smaller time step sizes , but in the limit  the probability density function becomes ill defined, one reason being that the product of terms

diverges to infinity.

Definition
For any two smooth curves ,

The Onsager–Machlup function is given by

Examples
The following examples give explicit expressions for the Onsager–Machlup function of a continuous stochastic processes.

Wiener process on the real line
The Onsager–Machlup function of a Wiener process on the real line  is given by

For every , the probability that  for every  satisfies

By Girsanov's theorem, the distribution of  under  equals the distribution of  under , hence the latter can be substituted by the former:

By Itō's lemma it holds that

Diffusion processes with constant diffusion coefficient on Euclidean space
The Onsager–Machlup function in the one-dimensional case with constant diffusion coefficient  is given by

In the -dimensional case, with  equal to the unit matrix, it is given by

where  is the Euclidean norm and

Generalizations
Generalizations have been obtained by weakening the differentiability condition on the curve . Rather than taking the maximum distance between the stochastic process and the curve over a time interval, other conditions have been considered such as distances based on completely convex norms and Hölder, Besov and Sobolev type norms.

Applications
The Onsager–Machlup function can be used for purposes of reweighting and sampling trajectories,
as well as for determining the most probable trajectory of a diffusion process.

See also
 Lagrangian
 Functional integration

References

Bibliography

External links
 Onsager–Machlup function. Encyclopedia of Mathematics. URL: http://www.encyclopediaofmath.org/index.php?title=Onsager-Machlup_function&oldid=22857

Functional analysis
Functions and mappings
Stochastic processes